Messaoud Aït Abderrahmane (born November 6, 1970) is a former Algerian football player who spent the majority of his career with JS Kabylie. He also played for MC Alger and MO Constantine before retiring. He played as a right-back and a centre-back.

An Algerian international from 1990 to 1993, Aït Abderrahmane was a member of the Algeria national team that won the 1990 African Cup of Nations and the 1991 Afro-Asian Cup of Nations.

Personal
Born in Mostaganem, Aït Abderrahmane grew up in the town of Issers.

Club career
Aït Abderrahmane started playing at age 12 for Issers' local club. At age 17, he joined the youth ranks of JS Kabylie. After two seasons with the junior team, he was promoted by Mahieddine Khalef and Stefan Żywotko to the senior team. During his time with JS Kabylie, he won a number of titles, most notably the 1990 African Cup of Champions Clubs.

At the end of the 1994–95 season, Aït Abderrahmane left JS Kabylie and joined MC Alger. He spent just one season there before moving to MO Constantine, where he would spend the next three seasons before retiring.

International career
Aït Abderrahmane made his debut for the Algeria national football team at the 1990 African Cup of Nations. Despite being included in the original squad for the tournament, he had to withdraw because of his studies. However, after Rachid Adghigh withdrew due to injury, Aït Abderrahmane was called up again. On March 8, 1990, he played his first game for the team, starting the last group stage game against Egypt. He played the entire match as Algeria won 2–0. In the semi-final against Senegal, he started the game on the bench but was substituted on in the 69th minute, replacing Kamel Adjas. He started in the final against Nigeria, playing the entire match as Algeria won the game 1–0 to lift its first continental trophy.

Honours

Club
 JS Kabylie
 Algerian Championnat National: 1988–89, 1989–90
 African Cup of Champions Clubs: 1990
 Algerian Cup: 1991–92, 1993–94
 Algerian Super Cup: 1992

Country
 Algeria
 Africa Cup of Nations: 1990
 Afro-Asian Cup of Nations: 1991
 Mediterranean Games silver medal: 1993

References

1970 births
People from Boumerdès Province
1990 African Cup of Nations players
Algeria international footballers
Algeria under-23 international footballers
Algerian footballers
JS Kabylie players
Kabyle people
Living people
MC Alger players
MO Constantine players
People from Mostaganem
Africa Cup of Nations-winning players
Mediterranean Games silver medalists for Algeria
Competitors at the 1993 Mediterranean Games
Association football defenders
Mediterranean Games medalists in football
21st-century Algerian people